Bakeshluchay Rural District is in the Central District of Urmia County, West Azerbaijan province, Iran. At the National Census of 2006, its population was 22,672 in 6,208 households. There were 28,864 inhabitants in 7,466 households at the following census of 2011. At the most recent census of 2016, the population of the rural district was 34,683 in 8,890 households. The largest of its 60 villages was Reyhanabad, with 10,536 people.

References 

Urmia County

Rural Districts of West Azerbaijan Province

Populated places in West Azerbaijan Province

Populated places in Urmia County